Croston railway station serves the small village of Croston, near Chorley in  Lancashire, England; the station is on the Ormskirk Branch Line  south west of .  It is unstaffed and the old station buildings are now privately occupied.

The station was built & opened by the Liverpool, Ormskirk and Preston Railway (later taken over by the Lancashire and Yorkshire Railway) along with the line in April 1849. "Line" is the suitable word here, as along the way are clear signs of the former double track trunk route from Preston to Liverpool Exchange, which was severely rationalised (including the reduction to single line working) in 1970.

Croston enjoys bus connections to nearby Leyland, Chorley, Southport, and Preston. It is on the B5247 into Bretherton.

The single platform still in use has a shelter & digital information screen, but has no ticket vending facilities.  Step-free access is available for disabled travellers.

Services

Monday to Saturdays sees an hourly service operate each way, with northbound trains continuing to  since the May 2018 timetable change (though not advertised as such).  There is no Sunday service.

References

External links

Railway stations in Chorley
DfT Category F2 stations
Former Lancashire and Yorkshire Railway stations
Northern franchise railway stations
Railway stations in Great Britain opened in 1849
Croston